John Voorhis "Tim" Bogert III (August 27, 1944 – January 13, 2021) was an American musician.  As a bass guitarist and vocalist he was best known for his powerful vocal ability and his fast runs, fluid agility and ground-breaking sound on his Fender Precision bass. He was one of the pioneers of using distortion with his bass to help it cut through the mix with the low-powered amps of his time which also imparted a very sharp-edged sound to it.  He was a frequent collaborator with drummer Carmine Appice; the duo performed in such bands as Vanilla Fudge, Cactus and the power trio Beck, Bogert & Appice.

Early life 
He graduated in 1963 from Ridgefield Memorial High School in his hometown of Ridgefield, New Jersey.

Career 
Vanilla Fudge was formed by Tim Bogert along with Mark Stein, Vince Martell, and Carmine Appice.  They recorded five albums during the years 1967–69, before disbanding in 1970. The band has reunited in various configurations over the years.

In 1970 Bogert formed the hard rock band Cactus with drummer Carmine Appice, guitarist Jim McCarty and lead vocalist Rusty Day. He then played with guitarist Jeff Beck, after the second Jeff Beck Group had disbanded in 1972 and eventually became a member of the power trio Beck, Bogert & Appice, late in 1972. As a member of the post-second Jeff Beck Group, also known as Jeff Beck Group, he toured Europe, Japan and the U.S. from January 1972 until January 1974. In late 1975, he played bass guitar on Bo Diddley's The 20th Anniversary of Rock 'n' Roll all-star album.

Bogert then joined up with Bobby and the Midnites, a musical side project assembled by guitarist and vocalist Bob Weir of The Grateful Dead. Despite touring with the group, Bogert left before their eponymous album was released and was replaced by Alphonso Johnson. He then joined UK group Boxer and played on their final album "Absolutely" in 1977 – he had co-writing credits on three tracks on this album. The album and subsequent tour met with an indifferent response and the band had folded by 1978. During 1981 Bogert toured with guitarist Rick Derringer and released an album Progressions. He recorded his second album Master's Brew in 1983 and recorded Mystery with Vanilla Fudge in 1984. In 1981 Bogert became a faculty member at the Musicians Institute in Hollywood. In 1993 he worked with the Japanese guitarist Pata, recording the album Pata.

In early 1999 The Hollywood Rock Walk of Fame recognised Tim Bogert's contribution to rock history. That year, he teamed up with Appice and Char to tour Japan in a unit called CB&A, with a live album released the following year. Later in 1999 Bogert worked with Triality, and  Shelter Me. In 2000 Bogert and Carmine Appice formed the power trio DBA with Rick Derringer and toured with Vanilla Fudge.

During 2009 Bogert joined blues rock trio Blues Mobile Band and recorded "Blues Without Borders" (2009) in Los Angeles.

In 2010 Bogert, with Mike Onesko on guitar and vocals and Emery Ceo on drums (both from the Blindside Blues Band), recorded Big Electric Cream Jam, a 10-track live tribute to Cream Live at The Beachland Ballroom Euclid Ohio.

Tim Bogert was also a part of the then Los Angeles based, The McGrath Project featuring Gary McGrath (Grammy Award winning producer), Chet McCracken (Doobie Brothers and America) Dean Minnerly (Three Dog Night and Aretha Franklin touring member) and Ann-Marita. They did three records, self titled, “Love is a Four Letter Word” and “Phoenix” released under 4818 Records. 

In early 2014 Bogert joined hard rock band Hollywood Monsters where he played on the album Big Trouble (on three tracks) which was released in 2014 on Mausoleum Records. The album features Steph Honde on vocals and guitars, Vinny Appice on drums, Don Airey on keyboards and Paul Di'Anno on lead vocals on the bonus track.

Personal 
In 2010, Bogert "reluctantly" retired from touring due to a motorcycle accident. He died on January 13, 2021, from cancer.   He is survived by his wife, Veda Vaughn Bogert, and his son John Voorhis Bogert IV.

References

Notes
Hjort, Chris and Hinman, Doug. Jeff's book : A chronology of Jeff Beck's career 1965–1980 : from the Yardbirds to Jazz-Rock. Rock 'n' Roll Research Press, (2000).

External links
 Tim Bogert Official web site
 Tim Bogert as featured at RockersUSA.com
Tim Bogert at Celebrity Rock Star guitarists
 
 

1944 births
2021 deaths
People from Ridgefield, New Jersey
American rock bass guitarists
Singers from New Jersey
Vanilla Fudge members
Cactus (American band) members
American heavy metal bass guitarists
American male bass guitarists
American heavy metal singers
Guitarists from New Jersey
Bobby and the Midnites members
Beck, Bogert & Appice members
20th-century American bass guitarists
20th-century American male musicians
20th-century American male singers
20th-century American singers
21st-century American bass guitarists
21st-century American male musicians
21st-century American male singers
21st-century American singers
Ridgefield Memorial High School alumni
Deaths from cancer in California